Kyle James Barone (born September 12, 1989) is an American basketball player who played for the  Earth Friends Tokyo Z of the B.League. He was the Western Athletic Conference Player of the Year as a senior in 2012–13 after leading the WAC in scoring (18.2) and rebounding (10.9) in conference games. Barone became the first player from the University of Idaho to be named the men's basketball player of the year in the WAC.

In Barone's four-year career between 2009–10 and 2012–13 he appeared in a school record 125 games. He graduated with 1,414 points—the fourth highest total in school history—as well as 864 rebounds, which ranks second. Heading into his senior season he was suspended indefinitely by head coach Don Verlin for violating team rules but was re-instated before the first regular season game. For his career, Barone averaged 11.4 points, 6.9 rebounds, 1.2 assists, 1.0 blocks and 0.4 steals.  He plays the center position.

Professional career
On October 24, 2013, Barone signed with PGE Turów Zgorzelec in Poland. After 5 games, Barone left PGE Turów, after averaging 2.4 points and 1.8 rebounds per game. In November 2015, Barone signed with Kingman Kaoliang Liquor in Taiwan's Super Basketball League. While with Link Tochigi Brex, Barone averaged 10.4 points and 8.0 rebounds per game.

In April 2019, Barone signed with the Columbian Dyip of the Philippine Basketball Association as the team's import for the 2019 PBA Commissioner's Cup.

References

External links
Kyle Barone @ sports-reference.com
Kyle Baron's Idaho profile

1989 births
Living people
Alba Fehérvár players
American expatriate basketball people in China
American expatriate basketball people in Hungary
American expatriate basketball people in Japan
American expatriate basketball people in the Philippines
American expatriate basketball people in Poland
American expatriate basketball people in Taiwan
American expatriate basketball people in Vietnam
American men's basketball players
Aomori Wat's players
Basketball players from California
Centers (basketball)
Earth Friends Tokyo Z players
Terrafirma Dyip players
Idaho Vandals men's basketball players
Kinmen Kaoliang Liquor basketball players
Kumamoto Volters players
Osaka Evessa players
People from Garden Grove, California
Philippine Basketball Association imports
Saigon Heat players
San-en NeoPhoenix players
Sportspeople from Orange County, California
Super Basketball League imports
Turów Zgorzelec players
Utsunomiya Brex players